Maesycwmmer F.C. are a Welsh football club from the village of Maesycwmmer near Ystrad Mynach, Caerphilly. The team was formed in the summer of 2010 and plays in the north Gwent Division 1. In the 2010–11 season the club has only one team but anticipates expansion in the coming seasons.

Honours 
The Angel Champions 2010

Players

References

External links
Maesycwmmer F.C.

Football clubs in Wales
2010 establishments in Wales